"Bad Eggs" is the twelfth episode of the second season of Buffy the Vampire Slayer. It was written by Marti Noxon and originally aired on January 12, 1998. Buffy must contend with vampire cowboys, the Gorch brothers and the bezoar, a prehistoric parasite.

Plot 

Buffy and her mother Joyce are shopping at a mall when Buffy notices a vampire leading a girl into a closed arcade. Buffy fights off the vampire who is later found to be a semi-notorious vampire named Lyle who travels with his brother Tector.

At school the next day, Cordelia and Xander make out in a closet despite the fact they both continue to bicker and agree they do not want a relationship. In health class, the teacher, Mr. Whitmore asks the students to pair off to take care of an egg. That night, Buffy's egg breaks open and a tentacle emerges, attaching itself to her face and inserting a tendril into her ear.

The next morning when she wakes up, the egg is back to normal, but Buffy is feeling ill. Back at the library, Giles comments on how both Buffy and Willow appear to be very tired and sluggish, both passing it off as a bad night's sleep. That night, a security guard enters the school basement and finds a large hole in the wall, only to be knocked unconscious by Mr. Whitmore.

Arriving home, Buffy sees her egg hatching. Suddenly a creature emerges and attempts to attach itself to her body. Buffy finally manages to stab it with a pair of scissors, before phoning Willow to warn her. Willow assures Buffy that she is fine, but her egg is seen to already be hatched. The next day, a creature is seen to have attached itself to Willow's back. Xander, who has hard-boiled his egg, decides to eat it, only to find a dead creature inside. The Scooby Gang proceed to the science lab to dissect the creature. However, Cordelia's egg hatches and the creature attaches to her, instructing her to knock Buffy unconscious, while Willow hits Xander over the head with a microscope. They drag Buffy and Xander to a closet, before joining a large group of students who pick up tools and head into the basement.

Joyce arrives at the library to pick up Buffy, however she instead encounters Giles, who places a creature on her back. They both then go into the basement. Buffy and Xander regain consciousness and find two unhatched eggs in the closet. Buffy smashes them, before they go to the library. Buffy finds a book describing the creatures who attach themselves to and then control a host, under the instructions of 'the mother Bezoar', an ancient, subterranean parasite. They follow a student into the basement and through the hole, where they find the host group digging up the mother Bezoar. Buffy decides to kill the mother Bezoar. However, Lyle and Tector arrive and attack Buffy. The fight eventually ends up in the working pit, where Willow orders the others to kill them. While fending off the hosts, Tector is grabbed by a tentacle and eaten by the mother Bezoar. Buffy is also seized by a tentacle, but she manages to grab a pick-axe which she uses to kill the mother Bezoar from the inside out, thus killing the creatures and freeing the hosts and scaring Lyle away.

Critical reception

The A.V. Club said it offered a take on the same material as the episode "Ted", with its themes about good parenting. However they found it lighter in tone and more action-packed. It also advances the theme that sex has consequences, which relates to events later in the season when Buffy and Angel consummate their relationship.

References

External links 

 

Buffy the Vampire Slayer (season 2) episodes
1998 American television episodes
Fiction about parasites
Fiction about mind control
Pregnancy-themed television episodes
Television episodes written by Marti Noxon